Ray Pointon (6 November 1947 – 1 July 2013) was an English footballer, who played as a defender in the Football League for Tranmere Rovers.

References

Tranmere Rovers F.C. players
Association football defenders
English Football League players
1947 births
2013 deaths
People from Birkenhead
English footballers